Joan Cooper may refer to:

 Joan Cooper (1922–1989), British actress
 J. California Cooper, the pen-name of Joan Cooper (1931–2014), American playwright and author
 Joan Cooper (social worker) (1914–1999), English civil servant and social worker